Burns Beach is an electoral district of the Legislative Assembly of Western Australia. It is located in Perth's northern suburbs, and named after the suburb of Burns Beach.

Geography
Burns Beach includes the suburbs of Burns Beach, Mindarie, Quinns Rocks, Clarkson, Tamala Park, Kinross, as well as portions of Currambine and Neerabup. It is bounded by Hampshire Drive, Marmion Avenue and Hester Avenue to the north; Wanneroo Road to the east; Joondalup Drive, Moore Drive and Burns Beach Road to the south; and the Indian Ocean to the west.

History
Burns Beach was created by the Western Australian Electoral Commission in a 2015 redistribution, and gained its first member at the 2017 state election. It incorporates areas that previously fell into the seats of Butler, Joondalup and Ocean Reef.

The district boundaries were redistributed in 2019 and saw the suburbs of Iluka and part of Joondalup being removed while the suburb Quinns Rocks was added.

Members for Burns Beach

Election results

References

External links
 ABC election profiles: 2017
 WAEC district maps: 2015

Electoral districts of Western Australia
2017 establishments in Australia
Constituencies established in 2017